Leconte Island is a small, uninhabited island in Qikiqtaaluk, Nunavut, Canada.  It is located in the Labrador Sea off Baffin Island's Lefferts Glacier.

References 

Islands of Baffin Island
Uninhabited islands of Qikiqtaaluk Region
Islands of the Labrador Sea